Heterocerus cinctus, is a species of variegated mud-loving beetle found in India, Andaman Islands, Pakistan, and Sri Lanka.

References 

Byrrhoidea
Insects of Sri Lanka
Beetles described in 1858